Zanabazar or Dzanabadzar is a 1989 novel by Mongolian author, Sengiin Erdene. It has been described as one of the "most popular historical novels of its period" in Mongolia.

References

Novels by Sengiin Erdene
1989 novels